Bangabasi College is a Kolkata-based liberal arts, commerce and sciences college. It offers undergraduate and postgraduate courses of the University of Calcutta. It was founded by Girish Chandra Bose, an educationist, social reformer and agriculturist, in 1887. It was the first nationalist college. It played a major role in Disobedience Movement of 1930 and sacrifice of Shri Jatindra Nath Das, an undergraduate student of the college The college celebrated its 125th anniversary from November 2011 to October 2012. It has been accredited by the National Assessment and Accreditation Council of India (NAAC) with "B+" certificate.

History 
Acharya Girish Chandra Bose founded an institution, named Bangabasi School, in a rented house in Bowbazar Street with six teachers and twelve students in the year 1885. Two years later, the college was established with private management, under the inspiration and guidance of Ishwar Chandra Vidyasagar. It started with F.A. course and slowly obtained affiliation for the B.A., B.L. and M.A. courses to meet the requirements of the college.

In 1930. the college moved into its present premises at 19, Scott Lane (now Raj Kumar Chakraborty Sarani). Honours course in various subjects were introduced. During the World War II another branch of the college was established in Kushtia (now in Bangladesh) in 1942, as the people of Kolkata were troubled by the bombing by Japanese troops. After the World War II it was closed. After Independence in 1947, the college started to see receive huge admissions and thus it created extra-pressure on the existing infrastructure and system. To cope up with the demand, college was divided in morning and evening sections and Acharya Girish Chandra Bose started a new evening section only for commerce. Later in 1964, it emerged as Bangabasi College of Commerce (renamed as Acharya Girish Chandra Bose College in 2005).

Through phase reduction scheme of the University Grants Commission (UGC), the shifts were separated and two new colleges, i.e. Bangabasi Morning College and Bangabasi Evening College emerged in the same building and Bangabasi College of Commerce in a separate building on 11 April 1965. With this, four colleges came up: Bangabasi College, Bangabasi Morning College, Bangabasi Evening College and Bangabasi College of Commerce. In 1979 Bangabasi College opened its own Commerce Department, and also became co-ed.

Courses 
Courses listed below are undergraduate, except zoology. Only zoology department has both undergraduate and postgraduate courses.

Language and Literature 

 Bengali
 English
 Hindi
 Sanskrit

Social Science 

 Economics
 Education
 Geography
 History
 Philosophy
 Political Science
 Psychology
 Sociology

Commerce 

 Commerce

Pure Science 

 Chemistry
 Computer Science
 Mathematics
 Physics
 Statistics

Biological Science 

 Anthropology
 Botany
 Zoology
 Environmental Studies

Postgraduate studies 
Postgraduate studies started in Zoology in 2005, under the semester system (CBCS), Department of Zoology, University of Calcutta.

Recently, it was acknowledged by the Department of Science and Technology, by sanctioning a grants-in-aid to the extent of Rs 20,00,000 for procuring modern equipment and adequate software support.

Timeline

Facilities 
Facilities provided in the college:

Student service cell 

 Student support cell
 Placement cell
 Counselling cell
 Women's cell
 Anti-ragging cell
 Grievance redressal cell
 Equal opportunity cell

Academic 

 Laboratories
 Internet and Wi-Fi
 Educational tours
 Scholarships

Other activities 
Other activities include:
 NCC
 Sports and Games
 Students fair
 Cultural activities
 Computer skill development
 Self defense

Notable alumni 
The alumni of Bangabasi College have achieved prominence in various fields. Following is the list of notable alumni of this college.
 
 
Chitta Basu, film director of Bengal during the sixties
Salil Chowdhury, music composer
Jatindra Nath Das, Indian independence activist, revolutionary and martyr.
Sudhi Ranjan Das, Chief Justice of India
Bishnu Dey, poet; winner of Jnanpith Award
Tushar Kanti Ghosh, recipient of Padma Bhushan, former editor, Amrita Bazar Patrika
Pankaj Gupta, sports administrator
Kansari Halder, Indian politician
Baby Islam, Indian and Bangladeshi cinematographer and film director
Hare Krishna Konar, Indian independence activist, politician
A. T. Kovoor, professor, rationalist
Swami Lokeshwarananda, monk of the Ramakrishna Mission
Chittabrata Majumdar, general secretary of CITU
Sreela Majumdar, actress
Indumadhab Mallick, Indian polymath who invented the ICMIC cooker
Ashesh Prosad Mitra, Fellow of the Royal Society, former director general, CSIR
Anantahari Mitra, Indian freedom fighter and martyr
Bimal Mukherjee, globe-trotter on bicycle
Subrata Mukherjee, politician, Minister
Rasikendra Nath Nandi, social reformer
Baishnab Charan Parida, politician, writer and social activist
Chittaranjan Saha, Bangladeshi educationist, was awarded Ekushey Padak
Amal Kumar Sarkar, chief justice of India
Dwijesh Chandra Sen, freedom fighter
Benudhar Sharma, recipient of Padma Bhushan and Sahitya Akademi Award, President of Assam Sahitya Sabha
Swami Yatiswarananda, vice-president of Ramakrishna Order whose headquarter is in Belur Math

See also 
Bangabasi Morning College
Bangabasi Evening College
Bangabasi College of Commerce

References

External links 
 

Academic institutions associated with the Bengal Renaissance
University of Calcutta affiliates
Universities and colleges in Kolkata
1887 establishments in India